José Parra Martínez (28 August 1925 – 29 February 2016) was a Spanish footballer who played as a defender.

Club career
Born in Blanes, Province of Girona, Catalonia, Parra's professional career was entirely spent with RCD Español in his native region. He signed with the club in 1947 from neighbouring Terrassa FC, going on to compete with the former in 12 La Liga seasons.

Parra scored his first and only league goal for the Pericos on 17 October 1948, in a 5–0 home win against RC Celta de Vigo. He retired in June 1960 at nearly 35, after a spell with Cartagena FC.

International career
Parra earned seven caps for Spain in one year. His first came on 9 April 1950, in a 2–2 away draw with Portugal for the 1950 FIFA World Cup qualifiers.

Selected by manager Guillermo Eizaguirre for the finals in Brazil, Parra played five times during the tournament to help to a final fourth place.

Death
Parra died on 29 February 2016 in Terrassa, at the age of 90. He was the last survivor of the team that appeared in the 1950 World Cup.

References

External links

1925 births
2016 deaths
People from Selva
Sportspeople from the Province of Girona
Spanish footballers
Footballers from Catalonia
Association football defenders
La Liga players
Tercera División players
Terrassa FC footballers
RCD Espanyol footballers
Cartagena FC players
Spain B international footballers
Spain international footballers
1950 FIFA World Cup players
Catalonia international footballers